Floyd Duncan MacDonald (born November 6, 1934) is a Canadian doctor and politician. He represented the electoral district of Queens in the Nova Scotia House of Assembly from 1971 to 1974. He was a member of the Nova Scotia Progressive Conservative Party.

MacDonald was born at Fredericton Junction, New Brunswick. He attended Acadia University and Dalhousie University, earning a M.D. degree from the latter. He resides in Hartland, New Brunswick.

MacDonald entered provincial politics in November 1971, winning a byelection for the Queens riding by 808 votes. He served one term and did not reoffer in the 1974 election.

References

1934 births
Progressive Conservative Association of Nova Scotia MLAs
Dalhousie University alumni
Physicians from New Brunswick
Acadia University alumni
People from Sunbury County, New Brunswick
Living people